Xylota spinipes is a species of hoverfly in the family Syrphidae.

Distribution
Thailand, Malaysia.

References

Eristalinae
Insects described in 1928
Taxa named by Charles Howard Curran
Diptera of Asia